B. Thoughtful (foaled 1975 in California) was an American Thoroughbred racemare. Raced by Swiss businessman Walter Haefner and trained by future U.S. Racing Hall of Fame inductee, Robert Wheeler, she won eight stakes races including the Oak Leaf Stakes and Hollywood Oaks.

The B. Thoughtful Stakes, a race for California bred fillies and mares run annually at Hollywood Park Racetrack was named in her honor.

Pedigree

References

 B. Thoughtful's pedigree and partial racing stats

1975 racehorse births
Racehorses bred in California
Racehorses trained in the United States
Thoroughbred family A10